Skadeskutt (Wounded) is a Norwegian drama film from 1951 directed by Edith Carlmar. The lead roles are played by Carsten Winger, Eva Bergh, Sigrun Otto, and Einar Vaage.

Plot
The architect Einar Wang (Carsten Winger) has been married to his adoring wife Else (Eva Bergh) for some years. The marriage has been happy, but one thing has cast a shadow over their life together: they have not had a child. Eventually, they decide to have a child. However, it turns out that it is not so simple. Shadows from Einar's past lie in wait. When he was quite young, he had an affair with a young girl, whom he sincerely loved. The girl became pregnant, and they agreed to have an abortion. Then she died because of the procedure. This has tormented Einar all these years, and at times he has felt like a murderer. He is eventually driven into a severe depression. Then one day the depression turns into mental illness, and he is admitted to a psychiatric hospital.

Cast

 Eva Bergh as Else Wang
 Sverre Andersen as a barkeeper
 Nona Bækken as Mrs. Aasen, a patient
 Brita Bigum as Liv, a nurse
 Otto Carlmar as the director of A/S Boligbygg
 Veronica Foyn Christensen	as Inger, a nurse
 Svend von Düring as Sandberg, a patient
 Daggen Dybberg as Wang's secretary
 Oscar Egede-Nissen as the assistant doctor on the 6th ward
 Kåre Hegseth as Enger, a doctor
 Egil Hjorth-Jenssen as Andersen, a patient
 Gunnar Hjorth-Jenssen as Falk, an architect
 Levor Lie as Nordlie, an engineer
 Lilly Larson-Lund as a gynecologist
 Sigrun Otto as Else's mother
 Arne Riis as Holst, an engineer
 Astri Rogstad as Aud, a nurse
 Agathe Running  as "the nanny," a patient
 Gunnar Simenstad as Rolf Lunde, a doctor
 Alfhild Stormoen as Wang's aunt
 Anders Sundby as the chief physician on the 6th ward
 N. Tinholt as Karlsen, a nurse
 Einar Vaage as the hospital director
 Klara Wang as the head nurse
 Ragnvald Wingar as an alcoholic
 Carsten Winger as Einar Wang, an architect
 Tore Winger as a worker
 Ingrid Øvre Wiik as Miss Brun, a patient (credited as Ingrid Øvre)
 Edith Carlmar as a patient (not credited)

References

External links
 
 Skadeskutt at the National Library of Norway

1951 films
Norwegian drama films
Norwegian black-and-white films
Films directed by Edith Carlmar